Nedelcho Stoyanov Matushev (born 14 February 1962) is a Bulgarian football manager and former footballer. He played as a central defender in his career.

Matushev was formerly manager of Neftochimic Burgas, Chernomorets Burgas, Nesebar, Spartak Varna and Bulgaria U-21 and Under-19.

Biography
He is former footballer of Slavia, Neftochimic Burgas, where he spent most of his career, Spartak Plovdiv and Rozova Dolina.
As a player plays a central defender position and is characterized by intransigence on the ground, solid game with a head, excellent inclusions in pieces before the opponent's goal.

Matushev is a head coach who tries to use the newest and most modern football theory and practice. He is not afraid to have young players and to work individually with them. Nedelcho likes to work with a strong midfield and to impose (himself on?) the game and to attack on both sides with the wingers and the full backs.
He developed a few players who became part of the Bulgarian national team such as Blagoy Georgiev, Vladimir Gadzhev, Georgi Chilikov, Stoyko Sakaliev, Ivelin Popov (Kuban Krasnodar), Nikolay Dimitrov (Kasimpaşa), Valeri Domovchiyski (Hertha BSC), and Vladislav Stoyanov (Sheriff). He worked with them in the U21 and U19 national teams. In August 2012 Matushev moved to Ukraine and started to work at most popular club in the northwestern part of this country - Karpaty Lviv. He was part of the staff of Nikolay Kostov and worked as a first team-coach. Karpaty Lviv started to play much better and more aggressively, but at the end of the season all staff members decided to leave because of internal club problems. In October 2019, Matushev joined Georgi Dermendzhiev's coaching staff, becoming assistant manager of Bulgaria.

Playing career
Matushev start to play professional football in Slavia for two years and after this moved to Bourgas and is now considered one of the true legends in this club Neftochimic, where he was famous for his strong playing style. With this team he got to the final of Cup of Federarion, but Neftochimic lost.

Managerial career

Achievements:
As coach:

2008: Final of the Armenian's Cup

2008: 2nd place in the Armenian L1 Championship

2008: Participation to the 1st round of UEFA Cup

2006: 2nd place in LG Cup (U23) in Vietnam with Bulgarian National Team U21

2005: Winner of Portuguese's "Teju Cup" (U 23) with Bulgarian National U21

2000: Final of Bulgarian's Cup U16

1996: Winner of the L2 Championship

Practice's Education:

2003: 2 weeks trial at Sparta Prague (L1, Czech Republic)

2002: 2 weeks trial at Real Sociedad (L1, Spain)

Education:

Matushev holds the UEFA Pro License and a Football master's degree from National Sports Academy.

References

Living people
1962 births
Bulgarian footballers
Bulgarian football managers
FC Urartu managers
PFC Lokomotiv Plovdiv managers
PFC Pirin Blagoevgrad managers
People from Kardzhali
Bulgarian expatriate football managers
Bulgarian expatriate sportspeople in Ukraine
Association football defenders